The Kerala State Film Award for Best Art Director winners:

References

PRD, Govt. of Kerala: Awardees List
Leadinglights Kerala Tourism

Kerala State Film Awards